La reina del pueblo is a Spanish comedy streaming television series created, written and directed by Raúl Navarro for Flooxer. It was released on Atresplayer Premium on 27 June 2021. Starring Lucía Caraballo, Ana Jara, Omar Banana, Cristina Colom, Helena Ezquerro and Máximo Pastor, the series is set in the patronal festival of a fictional village.

Premise 
The plot, a coming-of-age comedy set in the fictional Spanish village of 'Polvaredas de la Sierra', concerns the competition for the award of queen of the local patronal festival, which pits Zaida against Inma, who wants to win the title before leaving the village to study at the university.

Cast

Production and release 
Based on an original idea by Víctor Santos, the series was created, written and directed by Raúl Navarro. Produced by LACOproductora and Estela Films, shooting started by August 2020 in Noblejas (Toledo). Branded as a Flooxer original series, its full release on Atresplayer Premium was slated for 27 June 2021.

References 

2021 Spanish television series debuts
Television shows filmed in Spain
Television shows set in Spain
Atresplayer Premium original programming
Spanish-language television shows
2020s Spanish comedy television series
Television series by LACOproductora